The 1954 Texas A&M Aggies football team represented Texas A&M University in the 1954 college football season as a member of the Southwest Conference (SWC). The Aggies were led by head coach Bear Bryant in his first season and finished with a record of one win and nine losses (1–9 overall, 0–6 in the SWC). This squad became known as the Junction Boys.

Schedule

References

Texas AandM
Texas A&M Aggies football seasons
Texas AandM Aggies football